Théophile Abega Mbida (9 July 1954 – 15 November 2012), nicknamed Doctor, was a Cameroonian football player and politician. Playing as a midfielder he was part of the Cameroon national football team, playing all three matches at the 1982 FIFA World Cup and captaining the side to their first African Nations Cup victory in 1984, where he scored a goal in the final. He was nicknamed "The Doctor" in tribute to his footballing intelligence.

Club career
Abega started his career with Lion de Yaoundé and after with Colombe Sportive du Dja et Lobo. After, he played club football for Canon Yaoundé where he won the 1978 African Cup of Champions Clubs, 1980 African Cup of Champions Clubs and 1979 African Cup Winners' Cup titles as well as four Cameroonian championships and five Cameroonian Cups. Later in his career, he moved to France to play for Toulouse FC before finishing in Switzerland with Vevey.

International career
Following a collision with Zambian goalkeeper Efford Chabala at the 1986 African Cup of Nations Abega retired from football in 1987. Abega then went into politics, becoming the mayor of the sixth arrondissement of Yaoundé.

In 2006, he was selected by CAF as one of the best 200 African football players of the last 50 years.

Death
Abega died of cardiac arrest at Yaoundé General Hospital, Yaoundé, Cameroon on 15 November 2012.

References

External links
 
 
 

1954 births
2012 deaths
Association football midfielders
Cameroonian footballers
Cameroon international footballers
Cameroonian expatriate footballers
Olympic footballers of Cameroon
Footballers at the 1984 Summer Olympics
1982 FIFA World Cup players
1982 African Cup of Nations players
1984 African Cup of Nations players
1986 African Cup of Nations players
Toulouse FC players
Ligue 1 players
Canon Yaoundé players
Expatriate footballers in France
Cameroonian expatriate sportspeople in France
African Footballer of the Year winners
Africa Cup of Nations-winning players
Mayors of places in Cameroon